The Manthan Award is an annual award for South Asia given in recognition of exceptional digital content creation. Nominations are accepted from the public and multiple awards are given in many categories. In 2011 The Hindu referred to the Manthan Award as "one of South Asia's biggest events in information and communications technology for development initiatives." The award is issued by the Digital Empowerment Foundation and was partly inspired by the World Summit Award. It was created on 10 October 2004 and originally restricted to India, but in 2008 was expanded to include other South Asian nations.

In some cases awards are given for content creation tools such as Azhagi, a component enabling text entry in Indic scripts.

Winners

2006
 MouthShut.com

2007
 Arbit Choudhury

2010 

 Panjab Digital Library

2011 

 The Better India for best alternative news site across South Asia.
  Liwal Distance School via Pashto TV for Category: E-EDUaCATION & LEARNING.
  Apprain Content Management Framework for Category: E-Infrastructure.

2013
IndiaMart

2014
 Parikipandla Narahari

2015
 Paytm
 Pradhan Mantri Jan Dhan Yojana
 Xondhan e-Magazine
Ofabee developed by Enfin Technologies for the category of eLearning and education Ofabee.com later got acquired by mykademy.com 
 Feminism in India

2016

References

External links
Official Website
Ofabee Official Website
Mykademy Official Website
Enfin Technologies

Asian awards
Awards established in 2004
Web awards